The office of High Sheriff of Powys was established in 1974 as part of the creation of the county of Powys in Wales, replacing the shrievalties of the amalgamated counties: High Sheriff of Montgomeryshire, High Sheriff of Radnorshire and High Sheriff of Brecknockshire.

This is a list of High Sheriffs of Powys.

References

 
Powys